Azovsky (masculine, Russian Азовский), Azovskaya (feminine, Азовская), or Azovskoye (neuter, Азовское) may refer to:
Azovsky District, a district of Rostov Oblast, Russia
Azovsky Nemetsky National District, a district of Omsk Oblast, Russia
Azovsky (inhabited locality) (Azovskaya, Azovskoye), several inhabited localities in Russia
Azovske, a small village in Crimea, Ukraine.

See also
 Azov (disambiguation)
 Azovo
 Azovskiy, a surname